Reynard Butler (born 3 April 1989) is a South African cyclist, who most recently rode for UCI Continental team .

Major results

2010
 2nd Road race, National Under-23 Road Championships
2015
 1st  Team time trial, African Games
 1st PMB Road Classic, KZN Autumn Series
2016
 Tour Ethiopian Meles Zenawi
1st Stages 3 & 5
 1st Stage 4 Tour of Good Hope
2017
 1st Stage 3 Mpumalanga Tour
2018
 1st Stage 3 (TTT) Tour de Limpopo
 4th Road race, National Road Championships
2019
 1st Stage 4 Tour of China II
 4th 100 Cycle Challenge

References

External links
 

1989 births
Living people
African Games gold medalists for South Africa
African Games medalists in cycling
Competitors at the 2015 African Games
South African male cyclists
Sportspeople from East London, Eastern Cape
20th-century South African people
21st-century South African people